David Mitchell (29 April 1866 – 6 December 1948) was a Scottish football player, best known for his time with Rangers.

Playing career
Mitchell joined Rangers from Kilmarnock in September 1889. He was Rangers captain and won two Scottish Football League championships (the shared 1890–91 title and the perfect season of 1898–99), three Scottish Cups (1894, 1897 and 1898), four Glasgow Cups, two Glasgow Football Leagues and one Charity Cup. He made 171 appearances for the club in the league and Scottish Cup plus the 1891 championship playoff with Dumbarton, scoring eight goals. Mitchell also won five Scotland caps.

Retirement
He retired in 1900 and moved to Denmark to coach.

References

External links

1866 births
1948 deaths
Scottish footballers
Rangers F.C. players
Kilmarnock F.C. players
Scotland international footballers
Association football wing halves
Footballers from Kilmarnock
Scottish Football League players
Scottish Football League representative players
Scottish expatriates in Denmark